Markland is an unincorporated community in York Township, Switzerland County, in the U.S. state of Indiana.

The nearby Markland Locks and Dam on the Ohio River takes its name from the community.

History
Markland was laid out in 1874 by Charles Markland and named for him.

A post office was established at Markland in 1873, and remained in operation until it was discontinued in 1944.

Geography

References

Unincorporated communities in Switzerland County, Indiana
Unincorporated communities in Indiana